Sheikh Muhammad bin Shakhbut Al Nahayan was the Ruler of Abu Dhabi from 1816 to 1818, now part of the United Arab Emirates (UAE).

Having deposed his father, Shakhbut, Muhammad was himself deposed by his brother, Tahnun (with Shakhbut's support), and exiled.

References

Year of birth missing
Year of death missing
House of Al Nahyan
Sheikhs of Abu Dhabi
19th-century Arabs